Harald Andreas Gerotti Slåttelid (20 January 1895 – 1 March 1943) was a Norwegian trade unionist, newspaper editor and communist resistance member.

He was born in Os, Hordaland, to a father from Volda and a mother from Fana. He worked in Odda, and married Sigrid Johansen from Kristiania here in 1918. They had three children.

He was a member of the Norwegian Labour Party from 1909, and was organized in a union from 1911. He had a modest technical education. He chaired the local trade union from 1922, and was a board member of the Norwegian Union of Electricians from 1922 to 1923. From 1923 to 1930 he was a member of the supervisory council of the Norwegian Confederation of Trade Unions. He was a member of the executive committee of Odda municipal council for many years.

In 1923 he joined the Communist Party. He edited the newspaper Hardanger Arbeiderblad, and chaired the Communist Party in Odda from 1926. He continued his work for the Communist Party during the occupation of Norway by Nazi Germany, when the party was illegal. He was arrested by the Nazis on 26 May 1942, and imprisoned in Møllergata 19 and Grini detention camp. At his trial, on 27 February 19434, he was sentenced to death, and then placed in the death cell "" at Grini.

On 1 March 1943 he was executed at Trandumskogen. A press release from 1 March, signed  and titled "" appeared in the newspapers. Seventeen persons had been sentenced to death and executed, and Slåttelid's name was included on the list. In 1945 a total of 194 bodies were found in mass graves in the woods of Trandum, 173 Norwegians, six British and fifteen Soviet citizens.

His son Ørnulf (sometimes given as Ørnulv) Slåttelid, born 1919, became the illegal leader of the Young Communist League after Arne Gauslaa in 1942. He was arrested by the Nazis in the same year, and committed suicide in prison.

References

1895 births
1943 deaths
People from Odda
People from Os, Hordaland
Norwegian trade unionists
Norwegian newspaper editors
Hordaland politicians
Labour Party (Norway) politicians
Communist Party of Norway politicians
Norwegian resistance members
Resistance members killed by Nazi Germany
Norwegian civilians killed in World War II
Executed Norwegian people
People executed by Germany by firing squad
Grini concentration camp prisoners